Phloeosinini is the tribe of bark beetles which includes the genera Carphotoreus, Catenophorus, Chramesus, Cladoctonus, Cortisinus, Dendrosinus, Hyledius, Hyleops, Paleosinus, Phloeocranus, Phloeoditica, Phloeosinopsioides, Phloeosinus, Protosinus and Pseudochramesus.

References

External links 

Scolytinae